My Hour of Need is an album by jazz vocalist Dodo Greene featuring performances accompanied by the Ike Quebec Quintet recorded in 1962 and released on the Blue Note label. The 1996 Connoisseur Series limited edition CD reissue features another six previously unissued tracks recorded at later sessions for a proposed follow-up album.

Reception

The Allmusic review by Scott Yanow stated: "This set was a very unusual release for Blue Note. Greene's mixture of R&B and soulful blues in a voice very reminiscent of late-period Dinah Washington is much more pop and blues-oriented than the music on any other Blue Note release from the period. ... In reality, the main reason to acquire the relaxed set is for the warm tenor of Ike Quebec (who is perfect in this setting) and the occasional guitar of Grant Green. A true obscurity".

Track listing
 "My Hour of Need" (Ira Kosloff) – 4:54
 "Trouble in Mind" (Richard M. Jones) – 4:45
 "You Are My Sunshine" (Jimmie Davis, Charles Mitchell) – 3:00
 "I'll Never Stop Loving You" (Nicholas Brodszky, Sammy Cahn) – 4:01
 "I Won't Cry Anymore" (Al Frisch, Fred Wise) – 3:45
 "Lonesome Road" (Nathaniel Shilkret, Gene Austin) – 4:13
 "Let There Be Love" (Lionel Rand, Ian Grant) – 3:28
 "There Must Be a Way" (David Saxon, Sammy Gallop) – 3:29
 "Down by the Riverside" (Duke Jordan) – 4:06	
 "Little Things Mean a Lot" (Carl Stutz, Edith Lindeman) – 4:06

Bonus tracks on 1996 CD reissue:
"You Don't Know Me" (Cindy Walker, Eddy Arnold) – 2:44
 "Not One Tear" (Johnny Bell) – 3:03
 "I Hear" (Irvin Duke) – 3:37
 "Time After Time" (Jule Styne, Sammy Cahn) – 3:32
 "Everybody's Happy But Me" (Jeannie Cheatham, Mattie Fields) – 3:10
 "Jazz in My Soul" – 2:38
Recorded at Van Gelder Studio on April 2, 1962 (tracks 2, 7, 9 & 10), April 17, 1962 (tracks 1, 3-6 & 8), September 24, 1962 (tracks 11-14) and November 2, 1962 (tracks 15 & 16)

Personnel
Dodo Greene – vocals
Ike Quebec – tenor saxophone 
Grant Green – guitar 
Eddie Chamblee – tenor saxophone (tracks 11-14)
Edwin Swanston (tracks 11-14), Sir Charles Thompson (tracks 1-10) – organ 
John Acea – piano (tracks 15 & 16)
Milt Hinton (tracks 2, 7, 9 & 10), Herbie Lewis (tracks 1, 3-6 & 8), Wendell Marshall (tracks 11-16) – bass
Jual Curtis (tracks 11-16), Al Harewood (tracks 2, 7, 9 & 10), Billy Higgins (tracks 1, 3-6 & 8) – drums

References

Blue Note Records albums
Dodo Greene albums
Ike Quebec albums
1963 albums
Albums recorded at Van Gelder Studio
Albums produced by Alfred Lion